Tishrin, also rendered in English as Tishreen, is the Arabic name for the month of October. It may refer to:

Tishrin, Aleppo
Tishrin, Hama
Tishrin Dam
Tishreen Liberation Day
2019–2021 Iraqi protests
Tishreen (newspaper)
Tishreen Palace
Tishreen Park
Tishreen SC
Tishreen Stadium
Tishreen Stadium (al-Hasakah)
Tishreen University